Sergey Sergeevich Manukhin (1856–1922) was an Imperial Russian politician.

After graduating from the University of Saint Petersburg, he entered the Ministry of Justice. He served in the position of Director of the Ministry's First Department and Assistant Minister of Justice. In 1905 he briefly served as Minister of Justice in the Witte government. He left that post just prior to Witte's resignation after accusations of not being firm or energetic enough in the face of widespread disorders following the disastrous Russo-Japanese War of 1904–1905. He was appointed to the Imperial State Council in 1905.

References
 Out of My Past: The Memoirs of Count Kokovtsov Edited by H.H. Fisher and translated by Laura Matveev; Stanford University Press, 1935.
 The Memoirs of Count Witte. Edited and translated by Sydney Harcave; Sharpe Press, 1990.

1856 births
1922 deaths
Saint Petersburg State University alumni
Russian monarchists
Justice ministers of Russia
Victims of Red Terror in Soviet Russia